The Brihanmumbai Municipal Corporation election, 2023 is an election of members to the Brihanmumbai Municipal Corporation which governs Greater Mumbai, the largest city in India. The election dates are yet to be announced by the state election commission and could be held in March 2023.

Background 

Brihanmumbai Municipal Corporation (BMC) after the civic elections 2017 will now be with Nine new wards, three are in urban areas, three in western suburbs and three in eastern suburbs. The three wards in the city are Worli, Parel and Byculla, Bandra, Andheri, Dahisar in the western suburbs, Kurla, Chembur and Govandi in the eastern suburbs. overall will now be with 236 corporators. 127 seats is the reserved for women, out of which belonging to Scheduled Castes 8 seats reserved for women and 1 for woman belonging to Scheduled Tribes. There will be 118 seats for open Castes women total 219 seats will be for open group. 15 seats Scheduled Castes and 2 seats Scheduled Tribes will be reserved.

Schedule

Ward Structure Event

Poll Event

See also 

 2023 elections in India
 Brihanmumbai Municipal Corporation

References 

Brihanmumbai Municipal Corporation
Mumbai
B